Hunted is the ninth season of the computer-animated television series Ninjago: Masters of Spinjitzu (titled Ninjago from the eleventh season onward). The series was created by Michael Hegner and Tommy Andreasen. The season aired from 11 to 25 August 2018, following the eighth season titled Sons of Garmadon. It is succeeded by the tenth season titled March of the Oni.

The ninth season is a direct continuation of the storyline from Sons of Garmadon, and introduces one of the 16 fictional realms in the Ninjago universe: the Realm of Oni and Dragons. The plot is split into two parts that take place simultaneously, with one storyline following the stranded ninja, Kai, Cole, Jay, Zane, and Wu in the Realm of Oni and Dragons, and the other focusing on Lloyd Garmadon, Nya, and their allies surviving in Ninjago City following its takeover by Lord Garmadon (now holding the title of "Emperor"). The season features two main antagonists: the Iron Baron, leader of a group of Dragon Hunters in the Realm of Oni and Dragons, who attempts to capture the marooned ninja; and Garmadon, who, alongside the Sons of Garmadon, seeks to eliminate Lloyd and his allies so that no one will oppose his reign. Hunted also depicts the rapid aging of Wu from a child to eventually his former old self, allowing him to return to his previous role of the ninja's mentor. The season culminates in a final battle between Lloyd and Garmadon, in which the latter is defeated but warns Lloyd of an incoming threat, resulting in a cliffhanger that is resolved in the following season.

Voice cast

Main 

 Sam Vincent as Lloyd Garmadon, the Green Ninja
 Vincent Tong as Kai, the red ninja and Elemental Master of Fire
 Michael Adamthwaite as Jay, the blue ninja and Elemental Master of Lightning
 Brent Miller as Zane, the white ninja and Elemental Master of Ice
 Kirby Morrow as Cole, the black ninja and Elemental Master of Earth
 Kelly Metzger as Nya, the Elemental Master of Water and Kai's sister
 Paul Dobson as Sensei Wu, the wise teacher of the ninja
 Madyx Whiteway as Wu (kid)
 Mark Oliver as Lord Garmadon
Britt McKillip as Princess Harumi
Brian Drummond as Iron Baron

Recurring 

 Jennifer Hayward as P.I.X.A.L. a female nindroid
 Kathleen Barr as Misako
 Tabitha St. Germain as Mistaké
 Alan Marriot as Dareth
 Kathleen Barr as Faith/Heavy Metal
 Garry Chalk as Killow
 Maggie Blue O'Hara as Ultra Violet
 Brent Miller as Mr. E
Doron Bell as Griffin Turner
Heather Doerksen as Skylor
Scott McNeil as Karlof
Paul Dobson as Neuro
Andrew Francis as Shade
Kirby Morrow as Mr. Paleman
Maggie Blue O'Hara as Ultra Violet
Garry Chalk as Killow
Michael Adamthwaite as Luke Cunningham
Alan Marriott as Dareth
Kai Emmett as Young Garmadon
Jim Conrad as the First Spinjitzu Master
Brian Dobson as Ronin
Kelly Sheridan as Gayle Gossip
Michael Donovan as Police Commissioner
Paul Dobson as Mother Doomsday

Supporting 

 Ian James Corlett as Daddy No Legs
 Rhona Rees as Jet Jack
 Scott McNeil as Chew Toy
 Michael Donovan as Arkade
 Brent Miller as Muzzle

Production

Animation 
The animation for the ninth season was produced at Wil Film ApS in Denmark.

Direction 
The episodes for the ninth season were directed by Michael Helmuth Hansen, Peter Hausner, and Trylle Vilstrup.

Release 
The Lego Group released an official 90-second trailer on 27 May 2018 on the Lego YouTube channel to promote the season. The episodes were released in three parts on Cartoon Network on 11, 18, and 25 August 2018.

Plot 
With Emperor Garmadon ruling Ninjago City, Lloyd, Nya and their allies are forced into hiding. Lloyd feels helpless, having lost both his elemental powers and his friends, but finds hope when Mistaké tells him that the ninja have survived. Lloyd, Nya, and several Elemental Masters form a resistance against Lord Garmadon. The resistance infiltrates Borg Tower and Lloyd broadcasts a message of hope to the people of Ninjago. The Sons of Garmadon ambush their secret base, but Lloyd, Nya, Skylor and Dareth escape.

Meanwhile, the other four ninja and Wu (who has been rapidly aged up to a child and later to a teenager), are surviving in the Realm of Oni and Dragons. Kai, Jay and Zane are captured by Iron Baron and his band of dragon hunters and forced to compete in the Dragon Pit, a gladiator-style arena. Cole and Wu plot the ninja's escape and succeed when Firstbourne, the Mother of all Dragons, attacks the camp. During the chaos, Kai sets free the dragons that are held in captivity. In the wilderness, the ninja meet a rogue dragon hunter named Faith. She tells the story of how the First Spinjitzu Master shared a connection with Firstbourne by wearing his Dragon Armour. Wu, Faith and the ninja set off to find Firstbourne's nest. On the journey, Faith trains the ninja to use chain rifles to take down large dragons.

In Ninjago City, Lloyd discovers that Mistaké can shapeshift because she is an Oni. They plan to take down the Sons of Garmadon and eventually capture Harumi. Mistaké takes the form of Harumi to get Skylor close to Garmadon so that she can absorb his power. Unfortunately, Harumi arrives at Borg Tower at the same moment that Mistaké is impersonating her. Mistaké reveals her true Oni form and battles with Garmadon. During the fight, Skylor absorbs Garmadon's power and escapes, but Mistaké is killed. Skylor attempts to control Garmadon's Colossus using his power, but it poisons her. The Colossus falls onto a building, which collapses and kills Harumi, while Lloyd and Nya flee the city.

In the First Realm, the ninja are hunted down once again and captured, so Wu promises to lead Iron Baron to the Dragon Armour. When they arrive at Firstbourne's nest, Iron Baron seizes the armour, but Wu reveals that it was not the armour that caused Firstbourne to trust his father, but the goodness in his heart. Firstbourne encases Iron Baron inside molten rock, allowing Wu to take the armour. With the help of Firstbourne, the Ninja and Wu are able to return to Ninjago on the dragons.

Lloyd and the ninja are reunited in Ninjago City and plan a final battle with Garmadon. Wu and Lloyd fly to Borg Tower on Firstbourne to confront Garmadon. Meanwhile, the ninja attempt to bring down the Colossus using their chain rifles and are able to defeat it with the help of Ninjago citizens. Lloyd battles with his father at the top of Borg Tower, but realises that the fight fuels his father's powers and learns to resist him rather than fight back. As a result, Garmadon's powers are diminished and Lloyd's elemental power returns. Ninjago is finally free from Garmadon's reign, but before Garmadon is arrested, he warns Lloyd of an incoming threat he foresaw: "the darkness".

Episodes

Critical reception 
Reviewer Melissa Camacho for Common Sense Media gave Hunted a 3 out of 5 star rating and noted that the season "features the series' traditional themes of teamwork, sacrifice, and loyalty, but also addresses the need to protect a living species from harm, and the loss of a loved one". The reviewer also commented, "The latest installment of the franchise has all the mythical stories, action sequences, and evil characters necessary to create an entertaining action series."

References

Primary

Secondary 

Hunted
2018 Canadian television seasons
2018 Danish television seasons